Pleasant Township is one of twenty townships in Allen County, Indiana, United States. As of the 2010 census, its population was 3,312.

Geography

Cities, towns, villages
 Fort Wayne (south edge)

Unincorporated towns
 Yoder at

Adjacent townships
 Wayne Township (north)
 Adams Township (northeast)
 Marion Township (east)
 Jefferson Township, Wells County (south)
 Union Township, Wells County (southwest)
 Lafayette Township (west)

Cemeteries
The township contains Brenton Chapel Cemetery.

Major highways

Airports and landing strips
 Fort Wayne International Airport

School districts
 Fort Wayne Community Schools

Political districts
 Indiana's 3rd congressional district
 Indiana's 3rd congressional district
 State House District 79
 State House District 82
 State Senate District 16
 State Senate District 19

References

Citations

Sources
 United States Census Bureau 2008 TIGER/Line Shapefiles
 United States Board on Geographic Names (GNIS)
 IndianaMap

Townships in Allen County, Indiana
Fort Wayne, IN Metropolitan Statistical Area
Townships in Indiana